Juan Oscar Ríos (born December 15, 1966) is a former tennis player from Puerto Rico.

He represented his native country as a qualifier at the 1992 Summer Olympics in Barcelona, where he was defeated in the first round by Italy's Omar Camporese. The right-hander reached his highest singles ATP-ranking on October 14, 1991, when he became the 261st best in the world.

References

External links

1973 births
Living people
People from Río Piedras, Puerto Rico
Puerto Rican male tennis players
Olympic tennis players of Puerto Rico
Tennis players at the 1992 Summer Olympics
Sportspeople from San Juan, Puerto Rico
Central American and Caribbean Games medalists in tennis
Central American and Caribbean Games gold medalists for Puerto Rico
Central American and Caribbean Games silver medalists for Puerto Rico
Central American and Caribbean Games bronze medalists for Puerto Rico